Krzysztof Bizacki (born April 7, 1973 in Tychy) is a former Polish footballer.

Career
Bizacki began his career in the 1990/91 season, where he played for GKS Tychy.

He moved to Ruch Chorzów during the following season. His most notable moments include his participation for the team in the Intertoto Cup in 1998. He has played more than 300 games for Ruch, scoring more than eighty goals.

References

People from Tychy
Living people
1973 births
Polish footballers
Poland international footballers
Ekstraklasa players
Ruch Chorzów players
Odra Wodzisław Śląski players
GKS Tychy players
Sportspeople from Silesian Voivodeship
Association football forwards